Oxford Universal may refer to:

Oxford Universal Dictionary, a dictionary
Sinclair Oxford Universal, an electronic calculator